The ODP Corporation is an American office supply holding company headquartered in Boca Raton, Florida. The company has combined annual sales of approximately $11 billion, and employs about 38,000 associates with businesses in the United States. The company operates 1,400 retail stores, e-commerce sites and a business-to-business sales organization.

The company's portfolio of brands includes Office Depot, OfficeMax, Grand & Toy, ODP Business Solutions, Ativa, TUL, Foray, Realspace, and DiVOGA.

History

All three were formerly associated with Mr. HOW Warehouse, a home improvement company that Sher sold to Service Merchandise in 1983. The first store, located at the Lakes Mall in Lauderdale Lakes, Florida, opened in October 1986. The company announced its initial public offering of stock, and went public in December 1988.

Mergers and acquisitions
In April 1991, it merged with Office Club, which provided an expansion to the West Coast. In 1995, Office Depot entered the Mexican marketplace in a joint venture with Grupo Gigante, making it the retailer's first international expansion. Office Depot then entered the European and Australian direct mail market, after acquiring Viking Direct in May 1998.

On July 18, 1997, the Federal Trade Commission (FTC) reported that a federal district court in Washington, D.C. granted their request for a preliminary injunction, blocking Office Depot and Staples from merging as one company.

In December 2001, Viking Direct expanded to Central America with new retail stores in El Salvador, Guatemala, and Costa Rica through a joint licensing agreement. Office Depot sold Office Depot Europe (Viking Direct's parent) to an investment firm in September 2017.

On February 20, 2013, it was announced that Office Depot and OfficeMax would combine in an all-stock deal, pending regulatory approval and stockholder approval. The merger was completed on November 5, 2013. In May 2014, Office Depot announced the closure of four hundred stores, due to declining sales and customer migration to e-retailers.

On February 4, 2015, it was announced that rival Staples had agreed to purchase Office Depot, in a cash and stock deal worth approximately $6.3 billion. However, the Federal Trade Commission voted to block the merger in December 2015. The United States District Court for the District of Columbia granted the FTC a preliminary injunction against the merger on May 10, 2016, resulting in the proposed merger's termination.

In January 2017, Gerry Smith was named as the company's new CEO, effective February 27. Smith was the chief operating officer at Lenovo Group.

Office Depot bought technology services firm CompuCom in 2017 to help it compete with Amazon, warning investors at the time that the acquisition would show disappointing revenue in the quarter whose earnings would be reported in May 2019. Shares dropped significantly in early April 2019 as a result.

Environmental initiatives

Office Depot built a LEED Gold certified retail store in Austin, Texas, in April 2008. The Boca Raton headquarters was also awarded a LEED Gold certification in September 2010.

Sponsorships
In January 2005, Office Depot became a partner of NASCAR, with the title "Official Office Products Partner of NASCAR". In the same year, the company signed on as the primary sponsor of the #99 Ford Fusion, owned by Roush Fenway Racing and previously driven by Carl Edwards. They sponsored Edwards until the end of the 2008 NASCAR Sprint Cup Series season.

In December 2008, Office Depot announced that it would become the co primary sponsor for Tony Stewart and the No. 14 Chevrolet at Stewart-Haas Racing in 2009. In September 2012, Office Depot announced it would not renew sponsorship with Tony Stewart or Stewart-Haas Racing.

In November 2012, Office Depot partnered with the Born This Way Foundation to sell limited edition office supplies and give 25% of earnings to the organization.

FTC settlement

In March 2019, Office Depot and Support.com, Inc., a California-based tech support software provider, agreed to pay a total of $35 million to settle Federal Trade Commission allegations that the companies tricked customers into buying millions of dollars' worth of computer repair and technical services by deceptively claiming their software had found malware symptoms on the customers' computers.

Gallery

See also
 Staples Inc.
 OfficeMax

References

External links

 

 
1980s initial public offerings
1986 establishments in Florida
American companies established in 1986
Companies based in Boca Raton, Florida
Companies formerly listed on the New York Stock Exchange
Companies listed on the Nasdaq
Office supply retailers of the United States
Retail companies established in 1986